Rocky is a fighting video game published by Rage Software and released in 2002. The game is based on the Rocky franchise.

In the game the player controls Rocky Balboa on his journey from a club fighter, facing opponents like Spider Rico, until his championship bout against Apollo Creed and beyond. The game sticks closely to the movies, with all included characters being at least mentioned in the movies. In at least the PAL markets the PS2 and Xbox versions of the game were packaged alongside the original Rocky DVD release. A sequel was also made, called Rocky Legends.

Gameplay
The gameplay mirrors that of other boxing games of its generation.

In Story Mode, the player takes control of Rocky Balboa fighting many opponents, either new or already existent within the film series. Regular boxing match rules apply to any fight: winning depends on how many punches the player has landed or if the opponent has been knocked down and not gotten up within a ten-second time limit. The maximum number of rounds in a match is 15, and a round may last for a maximum of 180 seconds. Story Mode also includes training minigames, where the player can increase Rocky's stats. Each individual minigame increases a specific stat:

Punching Mitts: Strength
Speed Bag: Speed
Skipping: Stamina
Sit ups: Determination
Heavy Bag: Movement

Besides Story Mode, other modes include Exhibition Match, Sparring, and Knockout Tournament.

Audio and video content used from the film series
The game's intro movie features film footage edited from the five movies showing the main boxers and ends with an advert for the Rocky DVD. The remaining five cutscenes feature CGI footage using the in-game character models and original film audio recreating segments from the films. The song "Gonna Fly Now" is the only one from the movie series featured in the game, the rest of the score being created in-house.

Development
The game was developed for Xbox and PlayStation 2 at the Newcastle upon Tyne studio of Rage Software. A derivative GameCube conversion was developed by Steel Monkeys in Scotland, and a Game Boy Advance version with different gameplay by Virtucraft. It was published by Rage Software, and in the US additionally by Ubisoft.

Reception

The game was met with positive to mixed reception. GameRankings gave it a score of 78.75% for the Xbox version, 76.61% for the PlayStation 2 version, 72.30% for the GameCube version, and 58.63% for the Game Boy Advance version. Metacritic gave the game a score of 74 out of 100 for all console versions except the Game Boy Advance version, which was given a score of 63 out of 100.

Owing to positive critical reception and sales, after the closure of Rage Software the developers of the lead version formed Venom Games to create a sequel, Rocky Legends, this time published directly by Ubisoft.

Sequel

A sequel to the game, titled Rocky Legends, was released for the PlayStation 2 and Xbox on September 28, 2004. It was developed by Venom Games and published by Ubisoft.

References

External links

 

2002 video games
Game Boy Advance games
GameCube games
PlayStation 2 games
Rocky (film series) video games
Ubisoft games
MGM Interactive games
Video games developed in the United Kingdom
Xbox games
Rage Games games
Multiplayer and single-player video games